David Wild (born December 16, 1961) is an American writer and critic in the music and television industries and a contributing editor at Rolling Stone magazine. His published books include Friends: The Official Companion (1995), Seinfeld: The Totally Unauthorized Tribute (1998), Friends 'til the end (2004), and others.

Wild hosted the television series Musicians, which aired on Bravo! in 2001. His writing credits for television include over two dozen series and specials. In 2001, he was nominated for an Emmy for his work on America: A Tribute to Heroes. Wild has written for the Grammy Awards since 2001, and became a producer for the show in 2016.

Wild is an alumnus of Cornell University.

Wild was a frequent guest on The Adam Carolla Show, usually bringing a musical guest or a musical selection to feature on the show.

Books

External links
David Wild on Huffington Post

American music critics
Living people
Cornell University alumni
Place of birth missing (living people)
1961 births
American male non-fiction writers
Loomis Chaffee School alumni